Sufetula hypocharopa is a moth in the family Crambidae. It was described by Harrison Gray Dyar Jr. in 1914. It is found in Panama.

The wingspan is about 9.5 mm. The forewings have a pale orange-brown margin, lined on both sides with black. The terminal line is double and filled with this color. There is a patch of orange brown at the apex. The hindwings have a narrow outer border with a broad and diffused discal shade.

References

Moths described in 1914
Spilomelinae